is a 1990 magical realist anthology film of eight vignettes written and directed by Akira Kurosawa, starring Akira Terao, Martin Scorsese, Chishū Ryū, Mieko Harada and Mitsuko Baisho. It was inspired by actual recurring dreams that Kurosawa said he had repeatedly. It was his first film in 45 years in which he was the sole author of the screenplay. An international co-production of Japan and the United States, Dreams was made five years after Ran, with assistance from George Lucas and Steven Spielberg, and funded by Warner Bros. The film was screened out of competition at the 1990 Cannes Film Festival, and has consistently received positive reviews.

Dreams addresses themes such as childhood, spirituality, art, death, and mistakes and transgressions made by humans against nature.

Plot
The film does not have a single narrative, but is rather episodic in nature, following the adventures of a "surrogate Kurosawa" (often recognizable by his wearing Kurosawa's trademark hat) through eight different segments, or "dreams", each one titled.

"Sunshine Through the Rain"
A young boy's mother tells him to stay at home during a day when the sun is shining through the rain, warning him that kitsune (foxes) have their weddings during such weather, and do not like to be seen. He defies her wishes, wandering into a forest where he witnesses the slow wedding procession of the kitsune. He is spotted by them and runs home. His mother meets him at the front door, barring the way, and says that an angry fox had come by the house, leaving behind a tantō knife. The mother gives the knife to the boy and tells him that he must go and beg forgiveness from the foxes, refusing to let him return home unless he does so. She warns that if he does not secure their forgiveness, he must take his own life. Taking the knife, the boy sets off into the mountains, towards the place under the rainbow where the kitsunes home is said to be.

"The Peach Orchard"
On the spring day of Hinamatsuri (the Doll Festival), a boy spots a small girl dressed in pink in his house. He follows her outside to where his family's peach orchard once was. Living dolls appear before him on the orchard's slopes, and reveal themselves to be the spirits of the peach trees. Because the boy's family chopped down the trees of the orchard, the dolls berate him. However, after realizing that the boy loved the blossoms and did not want the trees to be felled, they agree to give him one last look at the orchard as it once was. They perform a dance to Etenraku that causes the blossoming trees to re-appear. The boy sees the mysterious girl walking among the blooming trees and runs after her, but she and the trees suddenly vanish. He walks sadly through the thicket of stumps where the trees had been, until he sees a single young peach tree, in full bloom, sprouting in her place...

"The Blizzard"
A group of four mountaineers struggle up a mountain path during a horrendous blizzard. It has been snowing for three days and the men are dispirited and ready to give up. One by one they stop walking, giving in to the snow and sure death. The leader endeavors to push on, but he too, stops in the snow. A strange woman (the Yuki-onna of Japanese folklore) appears out of nowhere and attempts to lure the last conscious man into giving in to his death. He resists, shaking off his stupor and her entreaties, to discover that the storm has abated, and that their camp is only a few feet away.

"The Tunnel"
A discharged Japanese company commander is walking down a deserted road at dusk, on his way back home from fighting in the Second World War. He comes to a large concrete pedestrian tunnel, from which a barking and snarling anti-tank dog emerges. The commander walks through the dark tunnel and comes out on the other side. He is followed by the yūrei (ghost) of one of his soldiers, Private Noguchi, who had died of severe wounds in the commander's arms. Noguchi's face appears blue with blackened eyes.

Noguchi seems not to believe that he is dead. Noguchi points to a light emanating from a house on a nearby mountainside, which he identifies as being his parents' home. He is heartbroken, knowing he cannot see them again, even while he remains respectful to the commander. Following the commander's wish that he accept his fate, Noguchi returns into the tunnel.

The commander's entire third platoon, led by a young lieutenant brandishing an officer's sword, then marches out of the tunnel. They come to a halt and present arms, saluting the commander. Their faces too are colored blue. The commander struggles to tell them that they are dead, having all been killed in combat, and says that he himself is to blame for sending them into a futile battle. They stand mute in reply. The commander orders them to turn about face, and salutes them in a farewell as they march back into the tunnel. Collapsing in grief, the commander is quickly brought back to his feet by the reappearance of the anti-tank dog.

"Crows"
An art student finds himself inside the world of Van Gogh's artwork, where he meets the artist in a field and converses with him. Van Gogh relates that his left ear gave him problems during a self portrait, so he cut it off. The student loses track of the artist, and travels through a number of Van Gogh's works trying to find him, concluding with Van Gogh's Wheat Field with Crows.

"Mount Fuji in Red"
A large nuclear power plant near Mount Fuji has begun to melt down. The sky is filled with red fumes and millions of Japanese citizens flee in terror towards the ocean. Eventually, two men, a woman, and her two small children are seen alone at the edge of the sea. The older man, who is dressed in a business suit, explains to the younger man that the rest of the population have drowned themselves in the ocean. He then says that the different colors of the clouds billowing across the rubbish-strewn landscape signify different radioactive isotopes. According to him, red indicates plutonium-239, which can cause cancer; yellow indicates strontium-90, which causes leukemia; and purple indicates cesium-137, which causes birth defects. He then remarks about the foolish futility of color-coding such dangerous gases.

The woman, hearing these descriptions, recoils in horror before angrily cursing those responsible and the pre-disaster assurances of safety they had given. The suited man displays contrition, suggesting that he is in part responsible for the disaster. The other man, dressed casually, watches the multicolored radioactive clouds advance upon them. When he turns back towards the others at the shore, he sees the woman weeping: the suit-clad man has leaped to his death. A cloud of red dust reaches them, causing the mother to shrink back in terror. The remaining man attempts to shield the mother and her children by using his jacket to feebly fan away the radioactive billows.

"The Weeping Demon"
A man finds himself wandering around a misty, bleak mountainous terrain. He meets an oni-like man, who is actually a mutated human with a single horn on his head. The "demon" explains that there had been a nuclear holocaust which resulted in the loss of nature and animals, towering dandelions taller than humans, and humans sprouting horns. He elaborates that, by dusk, the horns cause them to feel excruciating pain; however, they cannot die, so they simply howl in agony during the night. Many of the "demons" were former millionaires and government officials, who are now (in Buddhist style) suffering through a hell befitting for their sins.

The "demon" warns the man to flee, when the man asks where he should go to, the "demon" asks if he too wants to become a demon. The horrified man then runs away from the scene with the "demon" in pursuit.

"Village of the Watermills"

A man enters a peaceful, stream-laden village, where he sees children laying flowers on a large stone. He meets an elderly, wise man who is fixing a broken watermill wheel. The elder informs the younger man that residents of the village simply refer to it as "the village", and that outsiders call it "the village of the watermills". When the younger man inquires about the lack of electricity in the village, the elder explains that the people of his village decided long ago to forsake modern technology, and laments the notion of modern convenience and the pollution of nature.

The younger man asks the elder about the stone which children were placing flowers on. The elder tells him that, long ago, an ailing traveler died on that spot. The villagers buried him there and placed the rock there as a headstone. Ever since, it has become customary in the village to offer flowers there. The younger man and the elder hear the sounds of a funeral procession for an old woman nearby. Rather than mourning her death, the people in the procession celebrate joyfully the peaceful end of her long life. The elder goes to join the procession, and the younger man leaves flowers on the stone before departing the village.

Cast
 Akira Terao as I (The Dreamer)
 Mitsunori Isaki as I (The Young Dreamer)
 Mitsuko Baisho as The Dreamer's Mother
 Martin Scorsese as Vincent van Gogh
 Chishū Ryū as Old Man
 Mieko Harada as The Snow Spirit
 Yoshitaka Zushi as Private Noguchi
 Toshie Negishi as Woman with Child
 Hisashi Igawa as Man at the Nuclear Power Plant
 Chosuke Ikariya as The Demon
 Sachio Sakai
 Noriko Honma

Production

For the "Sunshine Through the Rain" segment, writer-director Akira Kurosawa built a near-exact replica of his childhood home; the nameplate on the gate even reads "Kurosawa". During production, Kurosawa showed the actress playing the mother a photo of his own mother, and gave her tips on how to act as her.

The setting of the segment "The Blizzard" may have been inspired by Kurosawa's personal life, since he confessed to being "a devotee of mountain climbing".

In "Crows", Vincent van Gogh is portrayed by American filmmaker Martin Scorsese. The segment features Prelude No. 15 in D-flat major ("Raindrop") by Chopin. The visual effects for this segment were provided by George Lucas and his special effects group Industrial Light & Magic. Additionally, it is the only segment in the film wherein the characters do not speak Japanese, but instead English and French.

The "Village of the Watermills" segment was filmed at the Daio Wasabi farm in the Nagano Prefecture. The segment, and the film as a whole, ends with an excerpt from "In the Village", part of the Caucasian Sketches, Suite No. 1 by the Russian composer Mikhail Ippolitov-Ivanov. The colorful costumes worn by the villagers during a funeral procession are based on unusual clothes that Kurosawa saw in a remote northern village in his childhood. The idea of the stone in this segment, on which passersby lay flowers, was possibly inspired by a similar stone from Kurosawa's father's home village in Akita prefecture:

Near the main thoroughfare of the village stood a huge rock, and there were always cut flowers on top of it. All the children who passed by it picked wild flowers and laid them atop the stone. When I wondered why they did this and asked, the children said they didn't know. I found out later by asking one of the old men in the village. In the Battle of Boshin, a hundred years ago, someone died at that spot. Feeling sorry for him, the villagers buried him, put the stone over the grave and laid flowers on it. The flowers became a custom of the village, which the children maintained without ever knowing why.Conrad, David A. (2022). Akira Kurosawa and Modern Japan, 212, McFarland & Co.

Critical reception
Vincent Canby of The New York Times gave the film a mostly positive review, writing: "It's something altogether new for Kurosawa, a collection of short, sometimes fragmentary films that are less like dreams than fairy tales of past, present and future. The magical and mysterious are mixed with the practical, funny and polemical." 

The Encyclopedia of International Film praised Kurosawa in relation to Dreams as having "long been a master of complex narrative. Now he wants to tell what he does." It praised the editing and staging in the film as "hypnotically [serene]", and called Dreams "one of the most lucid dreamworks ever placed on film." 

Donald Richie and Joan Mellen wrote of the film and of Kurosawa: "Beyond himself, he is beautiful because the beauty is in the attitude of the director. This is evident not only in the didactic approach, but also in the whole slowness, in the quantity of respect and in the enormous, insolent security of the work. That a director in 1990 could be so strong, so serious, so moral and so hopeful, is already beautiful."

On Rotten Tomatoes, the film has an approval rating of 66% based on 29 reviews, with an average rating of 6.40/10. The site's critics' consensus reads: "This late-career anthology by Akira Kurosawa often confirms that Dreams are more interesting to the dreamer than their audience, but the directorial master still delivers opulent visions with a generous dose of heart."

Home media
Dreams was released on DVD by Warner Home Video on two occasions: one on March 18, 2003, and the other on August 30, 2011 as part of the Warner Archive Collection.

The Criterion Collection released special editions of the film on Blu-ray and DVD on November 15, 2016 in the US. Both editions feature a new 4K restoration, headed by Lee Kline, technical director of the Criterion Collection, and supervised by one of the film's cinematographers, Shoji Ueda. Also included in the release is an on-set making-of documentary directed by Nobuhiko Obayashi called Making of "Dreams", which was filmed during its production, and Catherine Cadou's 2011 French documentary Kurosawa's Way.

Notes

References

External links

Akira Kurosawa's Dreams: Quiet Devastation an essay by Bilge Ebiri at the Criterion Collection

1990 films
1990s fantasy drama films
Japanese fantasy drama films
Japanese anthology films
Films directed by Akira Kurosawa
1990s Japanese-language films
Films about Vincent van Gogh
Films about dreams
Magic realism films
Metaphysical fiction films
Films with screenplays by Akira Kurosawa
1990 drama films
1990s Japanese films